The Tuks International are two back-to-back tournaments for professional female tennis players played on outdoor hardcourts. The events are classified as $60,000 and $25,000 ITF Women's Circuit tournaments and have been held in Pretoria, South Africa, since 2019.

Past finals

Singles

Doubles

External links
 

ITF Women's World Tennis Tour
Hard court tennis tournaments
Tennis tournaments in South Africa
Recurring sporting events established in 2019